The Ministry of National Co-existence Dialogue and Official Languages (formerly the Ministry of National Languages and Social Integration) (Sinhala: ජාතික සහජීවනය, සංවාද හා රාජ්‍ය භාෂා අමාත්‍යාංශය Jāthika Sahajeewanaya, Sangwāda hā Rājya Bhāsha Amathyanshaya; Tamil: தேசிய சகவாழ்வு, கலந்துரையாடல் மற்றும் அரசகரும மொழிகள் அமைச்சு) is a cabinet ministry of the Government of Sri Lanka responsible for the Sri Lankan government ministry responsible for formulating and implementing policy for communal coexistence by way of official and national languages and creating a national dialogue.

List of ministers 

Parties

See also 
 Culture of Sri Lanka
 Demographics of Sri Lanka
 Languages of Sri Lanka
 List of ministries of Sri Lanka

References

External links 
 Ministry of National Co-existence Dialogue and Official Languages
 Government of Sri Lanka

National Languages and Social Integration
National Languages and Social Integration
Indigenous affairs ministries